The Aurelian Walls are a line of city walls built between 271 AD and 275 AD in Rome, Italy, during the reign of the Roman Emperor Aurelian. They superseded the earlier Servian Wall built during the 4th century BC.

The walls enclosed all the seven hills of Rome plus the Campus Martius and, on the right bank of the Tiber, the Trastevere district. The river banks within the city limits appear to have been left unfortified, although they were fortified along the Campus Martius. The wall cut through populated areas: in reality the city at the time embraced 2,400 hectares or 6,000 acres. Pliny the Elder in the first century AD suggested that the densely populated areas, extrema tectorum ("the limits of the roofed areas") extended  from the Golden Milestone in the Forum (Natural History 3.67).

Construction

By 500 AD, the circuit possessed 383 towers, 7,020 crenellations, 18 main gates, 5 postern gates, 116 latrines, and 2,066 large external windows.

History
By the third century AD, the boundaries of Rome had grown far beyond the area enclosed by the old Servian Wall, built during the Republican period in the late 4th century BC. Rome had remained unfortified during the subsequent centuries of expansion and consolidation due to lack of hostile threats against the city. The citizens of Rome took great pride in knowing that Rome required no fortifications because of the stability brought by the Pax Romana and the protection of the Roman army. However, the need for updated defences became acute during the crisis of the Third Century, when barbarian tribes flooded through the Germanic frontier and the Roman army struggled to stop them. In 270, the barbarian Juthungi and Vandals invaded northern Italy, inflicting a severe defeat on the Romans at Placentia (modern Piacenza) before eventually being driven back. Further trouble broke out in Rome itself in the summer of 271, when the mint workers rose in rebellion. Several thousand people died in the fierce fighting that resulted.

Aurelian's construction of the walls as an emergency measure was a reaction to the barbarian invasion of 270; the historian Aurelius Victor states explicitly that the project aimed to alleviate the city's vulnerability. It may also have been intended to send a political signal as a statement that Aurelian trusted that the people of Rome would remain loyal, as well as serving as a public declaration of the emperor's firm hold on power. The construction of the walls was by far the largest building project that had taken place in Rome for many decades, and their construction was a concrete statement of the continued strength of Rome. The construction project was unusually left to the citizens themselves to complete as Aurelian could not afford to spare a single legionary for the project. The root of this unorthodox practice was the imminent barbarian threat coupled with the wavering strength of the military as a whole due to being subject to years of bloody civil war, famine and the Plague of Cyprian.

The walls were built in the short time of only five years, though Aurelian himself died before the completion of the project. Progress was accelerated, and money saved, by incorporating existing buildings into the structure. These included the Amphitheatrum Castrense, the Castra Praetoria, the Pyramid of Cestius, and even a section of the Aqua Claudia aqueduct near the Porta Maggiore. As much as a sixth of the walls is estimated to have been composed of pre-existing structures. An area behind the walls was cleared and sentry passages were built to enable it to be reinforced quickly in an emergency.

The actual effectiveness of the wall is disputable, given the relatively small size of the city's garrison. The entire combined strength of the Praetorian Guard, cohortes urbanae, and vigiles of Rome was only about 25,000 men – far too few to defend the circuit adequately. However, the military intention of the wall was not to withstand prolonged siege warfare; it was not common for the barbarian armies to besiege cities, as they were insufficiently equipped and provisioned for such a task. Instead, they carried out hit-and-run raids against ill-defended targets. The wall was a deterrent against such tactics.

Parts of the wall were doubled in height by Maxentius, who also improved the watch-towers. In 401, under Honorius, the walls and the gates were improved. At this time, the Tomb of Hadrian across the Tiber was incorporated as a fortress in the city defenses.

Later use
The Aurelian Walls continued as a significant military defense for the city of Rome until 20 September 1870, when the Bersaglieri of the Kingdom of Italy breached the wall near the Porta Pia and captured Rome. The walls also defined the boundary of the city of Rome up until the 19th century, with the built-up area being confined within the walled area.

The Aurelian Walls remain remarkably well-preserved today, largely the result of their constant use as Rome's primary fortification until the 19th century. The Museo delle Mura near the Porta San Sebastiano offers  information on the walls' construction and how the defenses operated. The best-preserved sections of the walls are found from the Muro Torto (Villa Borghese) to Corso d'Italia to Castro Pretorio; from Porta San Giovanni to Porta Ardeatina; from Porta Ostiense to the Tiber; and around Porta San Pancrazio.

Gates

List of gates (porte), from the northernmost and clockwise:

 Porta del Popolo (Porta Flaminia) – here begins via Flaminia
 Porta Pinciana
 Porta Salaria – here begins via Salaria
 Porta Pia – here begins the new via Nomentana
 Porta Nomentana – here began the old via Nomentana
 Porta Praetoriana – old entrance to Castra Praetoria, the camp of the Praetorian Guard
 Porta Tiburtina – here begins via Tiburtina
 Porta Maggiore (Porta Praenestina) – here three aqueducts meet, and via Praenestina begins
 Porta San Giovanni  – near Basilica di San Giovanni in Laterano
 Porta Asinaria – here begins the old via Tuscolana
 Porta Metronia
 Porta Latina – here begins via Latina
 Porta San Sebastiano (Porta Appia) – here begins the Appian Way
 Porta Ardeatina
 Porta San Paolo (Porta Ostiense) – next to the Pyramid of Cestius, leading to Basilica di San Paolo fuori le Mura, here via Ostiense begins

Gates in Trastevere (from the southernmost and clockwise):
 Porta Portuensis
 Porta Aurelia / San Pancrazio
 Porta Settimiana 
 Porta Aurelia-Sancti Petri (also known as Porta Cornelia)

Gallery

See also

 Leonine Wall, the first wall around Vatican City
 Museum of the Walls, Rome
 Sack of Rome
 Walls of Constantinople

Notes

Sources
Mancini, Rossana (2001). Le mura Aureliane di Roma. Atlante di un palinsesto murario, Quasar, Roma

External links
 Museum of the Walls official website
 Newspaper article of recent collapse (1 Nov 2007) Photo gallery of recent collapse(1 Nov 2007)

Buildings and structures completed in the 3rd century
Tourist attractions in Rome
Walls of Rome
Roman walls in Italy